Nesvacumab is an experimental monoclonal antibody originally designed for the treatment of cancer. It targets the protein angiopoietin 2. , it is in Phase II clinical trials for the treatment of diabetic macular edema.

This drug is being developed by Regeneron Pharmaceuticals.

References 

Monoclonal antibodies
Experimental cancer drugs